Pou Rieng, formerly Kampong Leav, is a district located in Prey Veng province, in south-eastern Cambodia.

Administration
According to the 1998 census, the Kampong Leav District consisted of 8 communes with a total population of 55,054. In 2008–2009 three communes—Baray, Cheung Tuek and Kampong Leav—formed a new district, the Prey Veng Municipality; according to the 2008 census, the population of the resulting five-commune district was 29,259.

In 2011 the district was renamed Pou Rieng (or Pur Rieng) and two communes which previously belonged to the Pea Reang district—Kampong Ruessei and Preaek Ta Sar—were added to the district. In 2019 the Ta Kao Commune was incorporated to the Prey Veng Municipality.

The following table shows the communes in the district as of 2020.

References 

Districts of Prey Veng province